Robert Nugent may refer to:

Robert Nugent, 1st Earl Nugent (1709–1788), Irish politician and poet
Robert Nugent (officer) (1824–1901), Irish-born American U.S. Army officer during the American Civil War and the Indian Wars
Robert Nugent (priest) (1937–2014), American Roman Catholic priest and co-founder of New Ways Ministry